Kempsey railway station is located on the North Coast line in New South Wales, Australia. It serves the town of Kempsey, opening on 3 December 1917 when the line was extended from Wauchope. It was the terminus of the line until it was extended to Macksville on 1 July 1919.

When built, the Macleay Chronicle Newspaper noted that the station was 'easily the finest this side of Newcastle and will have no rivals between here and Grafton.'

The station was damaged by fire on 23 December 1939. The parcels office was completely gutted while severe damage was done to the booking office, the stationmaster's office, the ceiling of the waiting room, the signal cabin and the roof and awning of the platform.

Maintenance on locomotives and rolling stock is no longer carried out in Kempsey and the engine shed and work buildings have since been demolished.

Platforms & services
Kempsey has one platform with a yard opposite. Each day northbound XPT services operate to Grafton, Casino and Brisbane, with three southbound services operating to Sydney.

References

External links
Kempsey station details Transport for New South Wales

Easy Access railway stations in New South Wales
Railway stations in Australia opened in 1917
Regional railway stations in New South Wales
North Coast railway line, New South Wales